KhK Murman Murmansk is a bandy club in Murmansk, Russia. From the 2018–19 season, the club plays in the Russian Bandy Super League, the top-tier of Russian bandy. The home games are played at Stadium Stroitel in Murmansk. The club colours are black and yellow.

The club was founded in 1952 and disestablished in 1996. After four years, it was started again in 2000.

References

Bandy clubs in Russia
Bandy clubs in the Soviet Union
Sport in Murmansk
Bandy clubs established in 1952
1952 establishments in Russia
Sports clubs disestablished in 1996
1996 disestablishments in Russia
Bandy clubs established in 2000
2000 establishments in Russia